This is a list of the 34 municipalities in the province of Las Palmas in the autonomous community of the Canary Islands, Spain. There are 21 municipalities on the island of Gran Canaria, 6 on the island of Fuerteventura and 7 on the island of Lanzarote.

The island of La Graciosa and the rest of the Chinijo Archipelago are part of the municipality of Teguise (Lanzarote); Lobos Island is part of the municipality of La Oliva (Fuerteventura).

It is the province of Spain with the least divided municipalities.

See also

Geography of Spain
List of cities in Spain
List of municipalities in Santa Cruz de Tenerife

References

 
Palmas, Las
municipalities in Las Palmas